The Ven. John Fothergill  (1808-1851) was the inaugural Archdeacon of Berbice.

He was baptised at 
on 26 October 1808. He was Rector of St Patrick, Berbice; and Ecclesiastical Commissary for British Guiana. His last post was as Vicar of Vicar of Bridekirk. He died on 8 May 1851.

References

People from Appleby-in-Westmorland
19th-century Guyanese Anglican priests
1808 births
1851 deaths
Archdeacons of Berbice
19th-century English Anglican priests